Donald George Carrithers (born September 15, 1949) is an American former professional baseball player.

Career
Carrithers was drafted out of Lynwood High School in Lynwood, California in the 3rd round of the 1967 Major League Baseball Draft by the San Francisco Giants. After working his way up through their farm system, he made his major league debut at the age of 20 in 1970, pitching 11 games with an earned run average (ERA) of 7.36. Carrithers started the 1971 season back in the minors, but was called up in June and was in the majors for good.

Over the next three seasons, Carrithers bounced back and forth between the starting rotation and the bullpen for the Giants, but various injuries limited him to no more than 25 appearances in each season. On May 14, 1972, he gave up Willie Mays's 647th career home run. His performance was below average in each season as well, and just before the 1974 season, the Giants traded him to the Montreal Expos in return for catcher John Boccabella.

Carrithers met with more success in Montreal, but injuries still hampered him. After two seasons of performing well in limited action, in 1976 Carrithers stayed healthy enough to throw 140 innings, his career high. However, his performance suffered a setback, as he went only 6–12 with an ERA of 4.43. The Expos became the second team to be frustrated by Carrithers, and they sold his contract to the Minnesota Twins the following spring. After yet another injury-filled campaign in which Carrithers made it into only 7 games, his major league career was over at the age of 28. He returned to the Giants in 1978, pitching for their top farm team, the Phoenix Giants, for whom he'd pitched from 1969 to 1971, to end his professional baseball career.

References

External links

1949 births
Living people
American expatriate baseball players in Canada
Baseball players from California
Decatur Commodores players
Fresno Giants players
Major League Baseball pitchers
Memphis Blues players
Minnesota Twins players
Montreal Expos players
People from Lynwood, California
Phoenix Giants players
Salt Lake City Giants players
San Francisco Giants players